The Elmira Mammoth are a minor league professional hockey team located in Elmira, New York, playing in the Federal Prospects Hockey League beginning with the 2022–23 season. Their home games are played at the First Arena. The team plays in orange, white, and purple jerseys.

On Tuesday, June 7, 2022, the Mammoth named former Elmira College and Elmira Jackals coach Glenn Thomaris as the team's first head coach.

The Mammoth announced on Monday, January 2, 2023 that Thomaris would be taking a leave of absence due to family matters. In his place, Justin (Mo) Levac was named Interim Head Player/Coach while Michael Cosentino was chosen as Interim Assistant Coach.

References

Federal Prospects Hockey League teams
Ice hockey clubs established in 2022